William McCowan (born 23 June 1891, date of death unknown) was a British Guiana cricketer. He played in one first-class match for British Guiana in 1911/12.

See also
 List of Guyanese representative cricketers

References

External links
 

1891 births
Year of death missing
Cricketers from British Guiana